Sawaal may refer to:

 Sawaal (film), a 1982 Hindi film
 Sawaal (album), a 2002 album by Aaroh